Senegalia montis-usti, the Brandberg acacia, is a species of plant in the family Fabaceae. It is found only in Namibia.

References

montis-usti
Endemic flora of Namibia
Near threatened plants
Taxonomy articles created by Polbot